Leyla Şahin v. Turkey was a 2004 European Court of Human Rights case brought against Turkey by a medical student challenging a Turkish law which bans wearing the Islamic headscarf at universities and other educational and state institutions. The Court upheld the Turkish law by 16 votes to 1.

Şahin (born in Istanbul in 1973) came from a traditional family of practising Muslims and considered it her religious duty to wear the Islamic headscarf. After studying in Vienna, in 1998 she was a fifth-year student at the faculty of medicine of the University of Istanbul. On 23 February of that year the Vice-Chancellor of the University issued a circular directing that students with beards and students wearing the Islamic headscarf would be refused admission to lectures, courses and tutorials. In March Şahin was denied access to a written examination on one of the subjects she was studying because she was wearing the Islamic headscarf. Subsequently, the university authorities refused, on the same grounds, to allow her to enrol her in a course, or to admit her to various lectures and a written examination. The university also issued her with a warning for contravening the university's rules on dress and suspended her from the university for a term for taking part in an unauthorised assembly that had gathered to protest against them. All the disciplinary penalties imposed on the applicant were revoked under an amnesty law.

Before the European Court of Human Rights Şahin claimed that the measures taken against her by the University of Istanbul violated Articles 9 and 14 of the European Convention on Human Rights — respectively the right to freedom of thought, conscience and religion, and the prohibition of discrimination — stating that the prohibition on wearing the headscarf forced students to choose between education and religion and discriminated between believers and non-believers. She also relied on Articles 8 (the right to privacy) and 10 (freedom of expression).

Talvikki Hoopes argues that the ECHR's decision to uphold the law shows how freedom of religion has been limited by the ECHR's interpretation of Article 9 of the European Convention on Human Rights.

In November 2015, Leyla Şahin became a member of Parliament in Turkey for the conservative AKP party.

Notes

References

External links
 Judgment of the Fourth Section of ECHR, 2004
 Full text of the European Convention on Human Rights
 Grand Chamber judgment, 2005

Article 9 of the European Convention on Human Rights
Article 2 of Protocol No. 1 of the European Convention on Human Rights
European Court of Human Rights cases involving Turkey
European Court of Human Rights cases decided by the Grand Chamber
2005 in case law
2005 in Turkey
Secularism in Turkey
2005 in education
2005 in religion
Hijab